Ode to the Spring is a 2022 Chinese drama film directed by Zhou Nan, Zhang Chi, Tian Yusheng, Dong Tue and  and starring Zhou Dongyu, Song Xiaobao, Wang Jingchun, Zhao Jinmai, and Huang Xiaoming. This film follows the story of ordinary people in Wuhan, Hubei fighting against the COVID-19 pandemic in early 2020. The film was theatrically released on 1 July 2022.

Cast
Zhou Dongyu as Shang Xiaoyu
 as Li Nanfeng
Song Xiaobao as Liu Erhong
 as Wang Dapeng
Wang Jingchun as Old Wang
Zhao Jinmai as Zhao Xiaomai
Huang Xiaoming as Li Jing
Huang Chao as Gong Chen
Bolo Yeung as Yang Shan
Zhang Hangcheng as Le Le
Rossi Zheng as Doctor Zhong
Zeng Mengxue as Xiao Xue
Fu Yushu as Zhang Jing
Wu Yanshu

Jia Ling
Zhang Ziyi
Xiao Yang
Zhang Zifeng
Chen Baoguo
Yu Qian

Yao Chen
Shen Teng
Xu Zheng
Jin Dong
Zhu Yilong

Production
Ode to the Spring was produced by the China Film Association.

Release
Ode to the Spring was released on 1 July 2022, in China, and on 8 July 2022, in the United Kingdom.

Reception
Douban, a major Chinese media rating site, gave the drama 4.6 out of 10.

References

External links

2022 films
2020s Mandarin-language films
Chinese drama films
Films shot in Hubei
Films set in Hubei
Films about the COVID-19 pandemic
COVID-19 pandemic in mainland China
2022 drama films